Lippe is an unincorporated community in Robinson Township, Posey County, in the U.S. state of Indiana.

History
A post office was established at Lippe in 1890, and remained in operation until it was discontinued in 1902. The community was named after Lippe, in Germany, the native land of a large share of the early settlers.

Geography

References

Unincorporated communities in Posey County, Indiana
Unincorporated communities in Indiana